Muiris Ó Fithcheallaigh, or Maurice O'Fihely, in Latin Mauritius de Portu Hibernicus or Mauritius Hibernicus;  – 25 March 1513) was an  Irish Franciscan theologian and Archbishop of Tuam.

Life
According to James Lynch, Fihely was a native of Clonfert in Galway, but according to James Ware and Anthony à Wood he was a native of Baltimore, County Cork.

Part of his education was received at the University of Oxford, where he joined the Franciscans. Later he studied at the University of Padua, where he obtained the degree of Doctor of Divinity. After his ordination he was appointed professor of philosophy at Padua.

O'Fihely acted for some time as corrector of proofs to two well-known publishers at Venice, Scott and Locatelli —in the early days of printing a task usually entrusted to very learned men— and he was one of the first Irishmen to engage with the new technology of the printing press. O'Fihely was acknowledged as one of the most learned men of his time. In 1506 he was appointed as Archbishop of Tuam and was consecrated at Rome by Pope Julius II.

In 1513 he received a Scholastic Accolade from the Church, styled as Doctor Flos Mundi, and has been the only Irish person to receive one so far.

He did not return to Ireland till 1513, in the meantime attending as Archbishop of Tuam the first two sessions of the Fifth Lateran Council (1512). On leaving for Ireland to take formal possession of his see, O'Fihely procured from the pope an indulgence for all those who would be present at his first Mass in Tuam. However, he was destined not to reach Tuam, for he fell ill in Galway and died there in the Franciscan convent.

Works
He was a student of the works of Duns Scotus and wrote a commentary on them which was printed at Venice about 1514.

References

Ó hAodha, Ruairí, 'Maurice O'Fihely: Printer, Publisher and Archbishop of Tuam', in Journal of the Old Tuam Society Vol. 7. (Tuam: 2010)

External links
Catholic Encyclopedia article
List of Franciscans
- Instagram Search - Instagram Search Engine Guide Blog

Archbishops of Tuam
1513 deaths
Irish Franciscans
Irish Roman Catholic theologians
16th-century Irish bishops
Year of birth uncertain
People from County Galway
People from County Cork
Irish expatriates in Italy
Irish expatriates in England
Scotism